Seth Mitchell (born May 29, 1982) is an American former professional boxer who competed from 2008 to 2013. He also played college football for Michigan State University.

Early life
Mitchell earned the nickname, “Little Superstar,” while growing up in Virginia Beach, Virginia by dominating older athletes in neighborhood pick-up basketball and football games. Despite being the youngest player on the court or field, he was often the first one picked to play. At the age of 12, Mitchell’s mother, Jeanette, moved him and his siblings to Brandywine, Maryland, where he first began to participate in organized sports.

High school
Mitchell attended Gwynn Park High School in Brandywine, where he played both football and basketball. In ninth grade, he stood six feet tall, weighed 200 pounds, and wore a size 16 shoe. In tenth grade, his weight increased to 220 pounds, but he grew less than an inch taller. Mitchell realized his lack of height could negatively affect his ability to compete in college basketball, but would not hamper his ability to succeed on the college gridiron.

Mitchell started as a freshman on the varsity football team and impressed college scouts with his talent. During his junior and senior seasons, he led his team in defensive statistics, totaling over 200 tackles, six interceptions, and 24 sacks.

Mitchell’s play on the field brought him recognition and many high school football awards, including his selection as one of the top 20 linebackers in the nation, being named the Maryland Defensive Player of the Year, Washington Post All-Metro Defensive Player of the Year, USA Today Maryland State Player of the Year, in addition to earning PrepStar and SuperPrep All-American honors. The most significant honor was being the first football player in Gwynn Park High School history to have his jersey number retired (No. 48).

College football
After receiving over a dozen NCAA Division I football scholarship offers, Mitchell decided to attend Michigan State University. As a redshirt sophomore, Mitchell played middle linebacker and was second on his team in tackles with 103. The same year, he led the Spartans in conference play with 10.6 tackles a game.  He recorded his career-high 17 tackles while playing against Ohio State. Mitchell was forced to hang up his cleats for good in 2005 due to damaged cartilage in his knee. He continued his education and graduated from Michigan State with a Bachelor of Arts in Criminal Justice and Security Management. His nickname, "Mayhem," was given to him by his football teammate, Jason Teague.

Following Mitchell’s college graduation, he circulated resumes in search of a job that would allow him to utilize his degree. One evening, he watched a former Notre Dame football opponent, Tom Zbikowski, win his professional boxing debut at Madison Square Garden. He decided to put his career in criminal justice on hold.

Amateur boxing career
Prior to 2006, Mitchell had never stepped into a boxing ring. An athletic background, strong work ethic and a focused demeanor helped prepare him to enter the sport of boxing. He had a brief, but impressive amateur career, with a record of 9–1, with nine knockouts.

Professional boxing career

In 2008, Mitchell began his professional boxing career. After only his second professional fight, he signed with Golden Boy Promotions.

On December 11, 2010, he fought Taurus Sykes on the undercard of Amir Khan vs. Marcos Maidana, winning the fight by knock out in the fifth round.

On March 5, 2011, Mitchell fought Charles Davis, at Honda Center, Anaheim, California, on the undercard of the Saul Alvarez vs. Matthew Hatton for the WBC light middleweight title. Mitchell won with a second-round TKO over Davis. The fight also gave Mitchell the fifteenth knockout of his career.

On May 13, 2011, Mitchell fought Nicaraguan boxer Evans Quinn and won the fight by knockout in round one. The fight was televised on Showtime.
Mitchell was then originally scheduled to fight on the undercard of Marcos Maidana vs. Robert Guerrero on August 27, 2011. The venue was set to be HP Pavilion, San Jose, California. He was set to open the HBO-televised show. His opponent for the fight was to be the American journeyman Mike Mollo. However the whole card got cancelled on August 18, due to an injury to Rober Guerrero.
After that he got a quick fight on September 16, in Texas Station Casino, Las Vegas against Hector Ferreyro. The fight was aired on TeleFutura and Fox in the United States. Mitchell won the fight by third-round TKO. He then fought on the Amir Khan vs. Lamont Peterson undercard on December 10, 2011, against Uzbek Timur Ibragimov. He opened the televised card on HBO by winning the fight on a second-round TKO.

His next fight was on April 28 as a part of the Bernard Hopkins vs. Chad Dawson undercard in Atlantic City. The opponent was former top contender Chazz Witherspoon. The fight was a co-main event and televised on HBO.
Mitchell overcame some rocky moments and won the fight by third-round TKO, marking him going 25–0–1 and his tenth straight KO victory. Witherspoon was dropped once in round three before receiving a standing 8-count and the referee stopping the fight. With the win, Mitchell also won the vacant NABO heavyweight title.

Mitchell was scheduled to return on July 14, 2012 against Johnathon Banks at the Mandalay Bay Resort & Casino, Las Vegas. However, an injury to Mitchell's hand postponed the fight. The fight was rescheduled three times, without happening. First on September 15 at the MGM Grand Garden Arena, Las Vegas, Nevada. Then it was reported to take place on October 6, only to be moved to November 3, and finally November 17 in Atlantic City. Mitchell was defeated by TKO in the second round after being knocked down three times.

The rematch between Mitchell and Banks was scheduled for June 22, 2013, at Barclays Center in Brooklyn, New York. The fight was broadcast on Showtime as the co-feature to Adrien Broner vs Paulie Malignaggi. Mitchell went on to defeat Banks by unanimous decision over 12 rounds.

On September 7, 2013, Mitchell faced Chris Arreola for the WBC International heavyweight title at Fantasy Springs Resort and Casino, California. Mitchell was stopped in one round. After taking a huge right hand from Arreola, Mitchell appeared to be unable to stand up unaided and clung to Arreola, who then tossed Mitchell onto the canvas to receive the count. Mitchell was then dropped again but although on unsteady legs, was allowed to continue with the fight. He landed a big left hook that stopped Arreola in his tracks, but after taking further punishment the fight was halted. This victory gave Arreola a shot at the vacant WBC world title against Bermane Stiverne in May 2014.

Professional boxing record

| style="text-align:center;" colspan="8"|26 Wins (19 knockouts),  2 Losses, 1 Draw
|-
|align=center style="border-style: none none solid solid; background: #e3e3e3"|Res.
|align=center style="border-style: none none solid solid; background: #e3e3e3"|Record
|align=center style="border-style: none none solid solid; background: #e3e3e3"|Opponent
|align=center style="border-style: none none solid solid; background: #e3e3e3"|Type
|align=center style="border-style: none none solid solid; background: #e3e3e3"|Rd., Time
|align=center style="border-style: none none solid solid; background: #e3e3e3"|Date
|align=center style="border-style: none none solid solid; background: #e3e3e3"|Location
|align=center style="border-style: none none solid solid; background: #e3e3e3"|Notes
|- align=center
|Loss
|26–2–1
|align=left| Chris Arreola
||
|
|
|align=left|
|align=left|
|- align=center
|Win
|26–1–1
|align=left| Johnathon Banks
||| ||
|align=left|
|align=left|
|-align=center
|Loss
|25–1–1
|align=left| Johnathon Banks
|
|
|
|align=left|
|align=left|
|- align=center
|Win
|align=center|25–0–1||align=left| Chazz Witherspoon
|
|
|
|align=left|
|align=left|
|- align=center
|Win
|align=center|24–0–1||align=left| Timur Ibragimov
|
|
|
|align=left|
|align=left|
|- align=center
|Win
|align=center|23–0–1||align=left| Hector Ferreyro
|
|
|
|align=left|
|align=left|
|-align=center
|Win
|align=center|22–0–1||align=left| Evans Quinn
|
|
|
|align=left|
|align=left|
|-align=center
|Win
|align=center|21–0–1||align=left| Charles Davis
|
|
|
|align=left|
|align=left|
|-align=center
|Win
|align=center|20–0–1||align=left| Taurus Sykes
|
|
|
|align=left|
|align=left|
|-align=center
|Win
|align=center|19–0–1||align=left| Derrick Brown
|
|
|
|align=left|
|align=left|
|-align=center
|Win
|align=center|18–0–1||align=left| Derek Bryant
| 
|
|
|align=left|
|align=left|
|-align=center
|Win
|align=center|17–0–1||align=left| Johnnie White
|
|
|
|align=left|
|align=left|
|-align=center
|Win
|align=center|16–0–1||align=left| Ryan Thompson
|
|
|
|align=left|
|align=left|
|-align=center
|Win
|align=center|15–0–1||align=left| Zack Page
|
|
|
|align=left|
|align=left|
|-align=center
|Win
|align=center|14–0–1||align=left| Jermell Barnes
|
|
|
|align=left|
|align=left|
|-align=center
|Win
|align=center|13–0–1||align=left| Andrae Carthron
|
|
|
|align=left|
|align=left|
|-align=center
|Win
|align=center|12–0–1||align=left| Alvaro Morales
|
|
|
|align=left|
|align=left|
|-align=center
|Win
|align=center|11–0–1||align=left| Andrew Greeley
|
|
|
|align=left|
|align=left|
|-align=center
|Win
|align=center|10–0–1||align=left| Joseph Rabotte
|
|
|
|align=left|
|align=left|
|-align=center
|Win
|align=center|9–0–1||align=left| Jason Bergman
|
|
|
|align=left|
|align=left|
|-align=center
|Win
|align=center|8–0–1||align=left| Dan Whetzel
|
|
|
|align=left|
|align=left|
|-align=center
|Win
|align=center|7–0–1||align=left| Shidevin Brown
|
|
|
|align=left|
|align=left|
|-align=center
|Win
|align=center|6–0–1||align=left| Mike Miller
|
|
|
|align=left|
|align=left|
|-align=center
|Win
|align=center|5–0–1||align=left| Ryan St Germain
|
|
|
|align=left|
|align=left|
|-align=center
|Win
|align=center|4–0–1||align=left| Henry Namauu
|
|
|
|align=left|
|align=left|
|-align=center
|Win
|align=center|3–0–1||align=left| Alexis Cruz Medina
|
|
|
|align=left|
|align=left|
|-align=center
|style="background:#abcdef;"|Draw||2–0–1||align=left| Alvaro Morales
|
|
|
|align=left|
|align=left|
|-align=center
|Win
|align=center|2–0||align=left| Maurice Winslow
|
|
|
|align=left|
|align=left|
|-align=center
|Win
|align=center|1–0|| align=left| Mike Miller
|
|
|
|align=left|
|align=left|

References

External links

Heavyweight boxers
1982 births
Living people
Boxers from Maryland
People from Brandywine, Maryland
Sportspeople from Virginia Beach, Virginia
American male boxers
Players of American football from Maryland